Ohmecarfentanil (RTI-4614-38), also known as Ohlofentanil, is a mu opioid receptor agonist from the class of fentanyl analogues which was found to be 30,000 times more potent than morphine in the rhesus monkey single dose suppression test. This makes ohmecarfentanil, along with some closely related analogues, among the most potent opioid agonists known at this time, even surpassing lofentanil and ohmefentanyl.

See also
 Opioid potency comparison

References

Opioids